Talk Dirty may refer to:

 Talk Dirty (album), a 2014 album by Jason Derulo, or its title song (see below)
 "Talk Dirty" (Doja Cat song), 2019
 "Talk Dirty" (Jason Derulo song), 2013
 "Talk Dirty" (John Entwistle song), 1981
 Dirty talk, sexual foreplay using graphic descriptions in speech
 Profanity, swearing

See also
 "Talk Dirty to Me", 1987 Poison song
 "Don't Talk Dirty to Me", 1988 Jermaine Stewart song
 Talk Dirty to Me Part III, 1984 porno
 Talk dirt or talking dirt, see Trash-talk
 Dirty Talk (disambiguation)